Rolf Thung (born 27 July 1951) is a retired Dutch tennis player. With Louk Sanders, he won the doubles title of the 1978 British Hard Court Championships.

Thung held a win–loss record of 6–8 for the Netherlands Davis Cup team.

Career finals

Doubles (1 title)

Grand Slam performance timelines

Singles

Doubles

References

External links 

 
 
 
Rolf Thung, founded People Intouch in 2004

1951 births
Living people
People from Naarden
Dutch male tennis players
Sportspeople from North Holland
Tennis executives
20th-century Dutch people